The  are film-specific prizes awarded solely by the Nikkan Sports.

Categories 
Best Film
Best Foreign Film
Best Director
Best Actor
Best Actress
Best Supporting Actor
Best Supporting Actress
Best Newcomer
Special Award
Yūjirō Ishihara Award
Yūjirō Ishihara Newcomer Award

External links
  
 List of awards on IMDB 

 
Awards established in 1988
Japanese film awards
1988 establishments in Japan
Recurring events established in 1988